God Told Me To is the sixth solo album from guitarist John 5. Released on May 8, 2012 

The album was initially announced in 2011. John 5 stated in a podcast to Kerrang magazine: "I have an album called God Told Me To coming out and it's half heavy and it's half acoustic, which I've never done before. I'm doing a cover of Michael Jackson's 'Beat It', an instrumental version of it. And it's gonna be amazing. I'm really excited about this record 'cause of the acoustic stuff, 'cause I've never done that before"

Album news

Promotion of the album started in summer 2011, when John 5 released the first of 4 singles from the album on digital release only.  The first being a cover of the Michael Jackson track Beat It.  The track was released on August 29, 2011, on what would have been Jackson's 53rd birthday.

There were three more single releases: Welcome to Violence (released on September 27), Noche Acosador (November 1st) and The Castle (December 20).

On September 16, 2011, it was announced the cover for the album would feature a painting of John 5 by Rob Zombie.  It was also announced that a DVD would accompany the final album release.

On October 30, 2011, John 5 unveiled the video Welcome to Violence on his website. The video was a montage piece similar to John 5's 2004 video 'God is Closed' which was released to coincide with his first album Vertigo.

On February 23, 2012 John 5 announced that the release date for the album had changed from April 10, 2012 to May 8, 2012.

Track listing

Track listing revealed on February 1, 2012 by the record label Rocket Science who deal with the distribution of John 5's albums.  Rocket Science posted the press release on their Facebook page which included the ten tracks on the album.

Credits
John 5 – All Guitars, Bass, Producer
Bourbon Bob – Drums
Chris Baseford – Mixing, Producer
Bob Marlette – Mixing, Producer
Rob Zombie – Artwork (Front & Back Painting)
Bruce Somers @ Undercurrent Studios Los Angeles, CA – Mastering

References

John 5 (guitarist) albums
2012 albums
Instrumental albums